The National Unity Platform (NUP), formerly the National Unity, Reconciliation and Development Party (NURP), is a political party in Uganda led by Robert Kyagulanyi Ssentamu (also known as Bobi Wine). The NURP was led by Moses Nkonge Kibalama from December 2004 until July 2020. On 14 July 2020, Kyagulanyi assumed leadership of the party and was declared the party flag-bearer for the January 2021 Ugandan presidential elections.

Background
The NURP was formed in December 2004, headed by Moses Kibalama. For the next 16 years, he served as the president of the party.

In July 2017, Robert Kyagulanyi Ssentamu was sworn in as the MP representing Kyaddondo East Constituency in the 10th Parliament (2016-2021). To win that constituency, he beat two seasoned politicians in a by-election: Sitenda Sebalu of the ruling National Resistance Movement (NRM) party and Apollo Kantinti of the main opposition party Forum for Democratic Change (FDC).

While running for the Kyaddondo East seat, Kyagulanyi was shunned by both the DP and FDC political parties, so he ran as an Independent candidate. He adopted the People Power slogan as his rallying call, leading to what is referred to as the People Power Movement in Uganda.

Since the formation of the People Power Movement in 2017, a number of legislators, including members of the ruling National Resistance Movement and opposition Forum for Democratic Change, have allied with People Power.

The People Power movement finally got a legally registered party NURP and changed the name to the National Unity Platform and on 22 July 2020, the founders of NUP, together with leading personalities from the People Power Movement, announced that Kyagulanyi had been elected President of NUP and presidential party flag bearer in the upcoming 2021 national elections.

The party is registered with the Uganda Electoral Commission.
The party's symbol is an umbrella in red, white and blue  surrounded by three circles in red, white and navy blue. The NUP symbol is fully gazetted by the Uganda Electoral Commission  

On 28 July 2020, the party unveiled membership cards that cost only USh1,000 (about USD 0.27 or GBP 0.2), an amount they said did not discriminate against social class and would be affordable to every Ugandan.

On 3 August 2020, the party president announced five members of parliament who crossed that day to the National Unity Platform. These included John Baptist Nambeshe (NRM), Patrick Nsamba (NRM), Francis Zaake (Independent) and Busujju’s legislator David Kalwanga (Independent). On 13 August 2020, sixteen more Members of Parliament, joined the NUP political party, crossing from the  Democratic Party (DP). This brought the total number of MPs who  have joined Kyagulanyi in NUP, during the first two weeks of August 2020 to twenty one (21).

On 14 January 2021 general elections took place. According to a survey performed by Market Intelligence Group, Bobi Wine had the support of about 59% of the Ugandans. On 16 January the Electoral Commission announced, even before all votes were counted, that Bobi Wine received 35.08% of the votes. This announcement was heavily criticized since there are 409 polling stations with a 100% turnout. Many videos of ballot box stuffing turned up. Other opposition leaders also stated that Bobi Wine had won and Museveni was falsely sworn in. Factchecker organisation Pesacheck published Uganda has not held honest election in over 30 years. On 9 February the European Parliament passed a resolution stating that the elections were violent and neither free nor fair.

On 3 August 2021 well-known government critic, blogger, and party supporter Fred Lumbuye disappeared from his home address in Turkey.

Electoral history

Presidential elections

Parliament of Uganda elections

See also
 List of political parties in Uganda
 Elections in Uganda

References

External links
Official Website
People website before registration as NUP
Bobi Wine unveiled as new leader of National Unity Platform As of 22 July 2020.
Five members of parliament join National Unit Platform.
 

2004 establishments in Uganda
Political parties established in 2004
Political parties in Uganda
National Unity Platform politicians